The main article describes all European Soling Championships from one the first held in 1968 to the announced Championships in the near future. This article states the detailed results, where relevant the controversies, and the progression of the Championship during the series race by race of the European Soling Championships in the years 1985, 1986, 1987, 1988 and 1989. This is based on the major sources: World Sailing, the world governing body for the sport of sailing recognized by the IOC and the IPC, and the publications of the International Soling Association. Unfortunately not all crew names are documented in the major sources.

1985 Final results 

Remarkable is that the Norwegian team won this European Championship without a single race victory. The team of Jochen Schumann was in the lead until the final leg of the event. On the last moment team Terje Wang took the 8th place in the final race thus winning the event by just one point!

 1985 Progress

1986 Final results 

 1986 Progress

1987 Final results 

 1987 Progress

1988 Final Results

 1988 Progress

1989 Final results 

 1989 Progress

Further results
For further results see:
 Soling European Championship results (1968–1979)
 Soling European Championship results (1980–1984)
 Soling European Championship results (1985–1989)
 Soling European Championship results (1990–1994)
 Soling European Championship results (1995–1999)
 Soling European Championship results (2000–2004)
 Soling European Championship results (2005–2009)
 Soling European Championship results (2010–2014)
 Soling European Championship results (2015–2019)
 Soling European Championship results (2020–2024)

References

Soling European Championships